The Janowski J1 Prząśniczka ("Distaff"), later named the Don Kichot ("Don Quixote") was an ultralight aircraft designed in Poland and marketed for homebuilding in the 1970s. Designed by Jarosław Janowski in 1967 and built with the help of some friends, it flew three years later. It had an unusual design, with a high, strut-braced wing and a pusher propeller mounted behind it. The pilot had a fully enclosed cabin, and the undercarriage was of fixed, tailwheel type. Original prototype was flown with Saturn engine design by Mr Janowski. This engine was made out of two motorcycle engines (MZ250). J1 was also flown with Trabant engine (29HP) and VW conversion (48BPH) made by Christine Aero Engines in Donlands - California. 

Later versions such as J1B were flown with Hirth and Rotax engines. Mr Janowski restricted maximum engine power for his design to maximum of 50BHP. There were several articles in worldwide press in regards of this design and many successfully built all around the world.

Derived from it was the J2 Polonez with a T-tail and a shoulder-mounted cantilever wing, being otherwise quite similar. Neither model was built in numbers. Further developments included the J3, J5 and J6.

Specifications (variant)

References

Further reading
 
 

1970s Polish ultralight aircraft
Janowski aircraft
Homebuilt aircraft
High-wing aircraft
Single-engined pusher aircraft
Aircraft first flown in 1970